Queen of Asia is the world's largest natural corundum blue sapphire. It weighs . It was found in Batugedara in the Ratnapura district, and it was revealed in December 2021.

See also 
The Star of Adam, largest star sapphire in the world
Serendipity Sapphire, largest star sapphire cluster in the world
List of individual gemstones

References 

Individual sapphires
Gems of Sri Lanka